Blue Ribbon was the budget computer software publishing label of CDS Micro Systems.

The label launched in 1985 mostly made up of games from the MRM Software back catalogue. MRM had been a label producing games for the BBC Micro and Acorn Electron. Blue Ribbon reissued these and also converted them to other platforms including Atari 8-bit, Amstrad CPC, MSX and Commodore 16/Plus/4. By the late 80s, Blue Ribbon were also releasing games for the ZX Spectrum and Commodore 64 including reissues of games for publishers including Superior Software, Bubble Bus and Artic as well as games originally published at full price by CDS. This included the first stand alone releases for games previously only available on compilations (e.g. Syncron and Camelot from Superior and Video Card Arcade and Dominoes from CDS). The Superior games were released as joint Superior/Blue Ribbon releases and carried advertisements for current Superior full price games. Although a small number of compilations were released on disk, all individual releases were on cassette between £1.99 and £2.99. The label's final releases were in 1991 and CDS never used the Blue Ribbon label for 16-bit releases.

Releases

Original releases
Astro Plumber (BBC, Electron, CPC, C16, MSX)
Bar Billiards (BBC, Electron)
Condition Red (BBC, Electron)
Diamond Mine II (BBC, Electron, CPC, C16/Plus/4, MSX)
Joey (BBC, Electron, C16)
Ravage (BBC, Electron)
M-Droid (MSX)
Trapper (BBC, Electron)
Return of R2 (BBC, Electron)
Mango (BBC, Electron)
3D Dotty (BBC, Electron)
Spooksville (BBC, Electron)
System 8: The Pools Predictor (BBC, Electron, Atari, CPC, C16, C64, ZX, MSX)
Turf-Form: Beat the Bookie (BBC, Electron, Atari, CPC, C16, C64, ZX, MSX)
Hi-Q-Quiz (BBC, Electron, CPC, C64, ZX)
Syntax (CPC, C64, ZX)
Wulfpack (CPC, C64, ZX)
Balloon Buster (BBC, Electron, CPC)

Reissues and ports

MRM Software
3D Munchy / Hangman (BBC)
Banana Man / Secret Sam 1 (BBC)
Guy In The Hat / Secret Sam 2 (BBC)
Castle Assault (BBC, Electron, Atari, CPC)
Darts (BBC, Electron, Atari, CPC, C64, ZX, MSX)
Diamond Mine (BBC, Electron, Atari, CPC, C16)
Q Man (BBC)
Q Man's Brother (BBC)
Screwball (BBC, Atari, CPC)
Artist (aka Artmaster) (BBC, CPC)
Nightmare Maze (BBC, Electron, Atari, CPC)

CDS Software
Caterpillar / Leapfrog (ZX)
Gobble a Ghost / 3D Painter (ZX)
Spectrum Safari / Winged Warlords (ZX)
Timebomb / Magic Meanies (ZX)
Pool (CPC, ZX)
Video Card Arcade (BBC, Electron, CPC, C64, ZX) - previously only available as part of The Complete Home Entertainment Centre
Golf (BBC, Electron) - reissue of Birdie Barrage
Steve Davis Snooker (BBC, Electron, Atari, CPC, C16, C64, ZX, MSX)
Dominoes (BBC, Electron, CPC, ZX) - previously only available as part of The Complete Home Entertainment Centre

Bubble Bus Software
The Ice Temple (CPC, C64, ZX)
Wizard's Lair (CPC, C64, ZX, MSX)
Moonlight Madness (ZX)
Cave Fighter (C16, C64)

Artic Computing
Rugby (ZX) - reissue of International Rugby

Artworx
Ice Hockey (C64) - reissue of International Hockey
Strip Poker (C64)

Superior Software
Repton (BBC, Electron)
Karate Combat (BBC, Electron)
Percy Penguin (BBC, Electron)
Mr Wiz (BBC, Electron)
Stryker's Run (BBC, Electron)
Citadel (BBC, Electron)
DeathStar (BBC, Electron)
Smash and Grab (BBC, Electron)
Repton 2 (BBC, Electron)
Thrust (BBC, Electron)
Ravenskull (BBC, Electron)
Galaforce (BBC, Electron)
Codename: Droid (BBC, Electron)
Crazee Rider (BBC, Electron)
Syncron (BBC, Electron) - previously only available on a Superior Collection compilation
Repton Around The World (BBC, Electron) - reissue of Around the World in 40 Screens
Palace of Magic (BBC, Electron)
Elixir (BBC, Electron)
The Life of Repton (BBC, Electron)
Spellbinder (BBC, Electron)
Quest (BBC, Electron)
Spycat (BBC, Electron)
Repton Thru Time (BBC, Electron)
Pipeline (BBC, Electron)
Barbarian (BBC, Electron)
Repton 3 (BBC, Electron)
Bonecruncher (BBC, Electron)
Bug Blaster (BBC, Electron) - originally an Alligata game that had featured on a Superior compilation
Camelot (BBC, Electron) - previously only available on a Play It Again Sam compilation
Galaforce 2 (BBC, Electron) - previously only available on a Play It Again Sam compilation
Barbarian II (BBC, Electron)
The Last Ninja (BBC, Electron)
Predator (BBC, Electron)
Ballistix (BBC, Electron)
Superior Soccer (BBC, Electron)

External links
Blue Ribbon at Acorn Electron World
Superior/Blue Ribbon at Acorn Electron World
Blue Ribbon at CPC Power
Blue Ribbon at Plus/4 World
Blue Ribbon at Retromuseums - Collectors Insights
Blue Ribbon at Stairway to Hell
Defunct video game companies of the United Kingdom
Video game publishers